is a Japanese para-badminton player who competes in international elite competitions. She won a gold medal in Women's singles WH1, at the 2020 Summer Paralympics, and Women's doubles WH1–WH2 .

She is twice a World women's singles champion and a world champion in the doubles with teammate Yuma Yamazaki.

Life 
Satomi sustained a spinal cord injury when she was involved in a car accident in May 2016.

Achievements

Paralympic Games 
Women's singles

Women's doubles

World Championships 

Women's singles

Women's doubles

Asian Para Games 
Women's singles

BWF Para Badminton World Circuit (4 titles) 
The BWF Para Badminton World Circuit – Grade 2, Level 1, 2 and 3 tournaments has been sanctioned by the Badminton World Federation from 2022.

Women's singles

Women's doubles

International Tournaments (11 titles, 2 runners-up) 
Women's singles

Women's doubles

References

External links
 Sarina Satomi at BWFpara.tournamentsoftware.com

Notes 

1998 births
Living people
People from Chiba (city)
People with paraplegia
Japanese para-badminton players
Paralympic badminton players of Japan
Badminton players at the 2020 Summer Paralympics
Medalists at the 2020 Summer Paralympics
Paralympic gold medalists for Japan
Paralympic medalists in badminton